Micrulia cinerea is a moth in the family Geometridae. It is found on the Moluccas.

References

Moths described in 1896
Eupitheciini